The women's scratch at the 2019 European Games was held at the Minsk Velodrome on 28 June 2019.

Results
First rider across the line without a net lap loss wins.

References

Women's scratch